The Stars Football League (SFL) was an American football league that operated primarily in Florida from 2011 to 2013. The league was headquartered in Grosse Pointe, Michigan.

It was a single-entity league and players were paid a few hundred dollars a game, while teams revenue came from tickets, concessions and sponsorships. The SFL also bought airtime on local radio stations and tried to sells shares in the league.

Rules
The league followed standard American football rules, with two exceptions. Field goals of over 50 yards were awarded four points instead of three, as in NFL Europe. The league also offered a three-point conversion from ten yards (1-2-3 rule), just as the original XFL did in its playoffs. These rule changes were intended to help teams that fall behind in a game to catch up more quickly. In 2013 the rule became a 1-2-3-4 rule with 4 points awarded for passing or running the ball into the endzone from 20 Yards out.  The league did not use instant replay (the league never acquired a television contract, making instant replay impossible). The league also used a slightly shorter play clock.

Teams were restricted to 35 or 36 players on each roster, with any person 18 years of age or older eligible to play. Its level of play could be classified somewhere between minor league and semi-professional; players were compensated between $100 and $500 per game, on par with most indoor football leagues, but had to pay their own travel expenses for away games.

Teams

2011 season
The League awarded charter memberships to eight cities in seven states.  Teams were awarded to Las Vegas (Nevada), Little Rock (Arkansas), Pontiac (Michigan), New Orleans (Louisiana), Mobile (Alabama), and Charleston (South Carolina), along with Daytona Beach and Fort Lauderdale (Florida).  For reasons unknown the Las Vegas Gamblers, Little Rock Ironmen, Charleston Admirals and the Mobile Gladiators never made it to play; the Ironmen, in particular, have been the subject of repeated relocations (the SFL has indicated the Ironmen club would play in Little Rock, then Bradenton, Florida, then Cleveland, Ohio, before finally beginning play in 2013 nominally representing Miami, Florida, and sharing a stadium with Fort Lauderdale).

The Michigan Coyotes, having a much greater distance between themselves and the rest of the league, were declared a traveling team for their two games in the 2011 season. Had any home games been scheduled the team was to play at the Silverdome (Wisner Stadium was another potential stadium that the league mentioned for the team). Fort Lauderdale played its first season at Lockhart Stadium and Daytona Beach at Municipal Stadium.

The league released its 2011 schedule on July 2, 2011; said schedule was abruptly cut short in early August after several on-the-fly schedule and venue changes. In the end, each of the four teams played two of the other three teams at least once, with Daytona Beach and Fort Lauderdale playing each other three times, due to their proximity to each other. Winners of each game are underlined.

Results
June 30, 2011 Daytona Beach 26 @ Fort Lauderdale 13
July 16, 2011 Fort Lauderdale 22 @ Daytona Beach 4
July 22, 2011 Fort Lauderdale 9 @ New Orleans 15 (OT)
July 23, 2011 Michigan 18 @ Daytona Beach 38
August 4, 2011  Fort Lauderdale 29 @ Daytona Beach 31
August 12, 2011 Michigan 6 @ New Orleans 21

Final standings

2012 season
The 2012 season was originally scheduled to begin on Armed Forces Day (May 19, 2012) and continue through July; although a northern division was originally planned in addition to the Florida teams, neither of the two new proposed teams (in Cleveland and Canton, Ohio) meant to complement the existing Michigan Coyotes (who were to play that year at Atwood Stadium in Flint) would form, eventually forcing the Coyotes' mothballing. New Orleans left the league and joined other semi-pro leagues. In Florida, the SFL also proposed a team named the "Orange" (initially in Tampa and then in Fort Pierce) and a team based at South County Stadium in Port St. Lucie, neither of which came to fruition; likewise, the plan to play a game in Freeport, Bahamas's Grand Bahama Stadium also never occurred. In the end, of the roughly eight teams originally announced as participants in the 2012 SFL season, only three would make it to play: Daytona Beach (who had originally left the league, only to return) and Fort Lauderdale, in addition to the Fort Myers Swampdogs (also known as the Southwest Florida Swampdogs), who played the season at Bishop Verot High School. Daytona Beach's lone home game (the season opener) would be held at Lawnwood Stadium in Fort Pierce.

The season finally began on June 9, 2012, with a matchup between Daytona Beach and Fort Lauderdale in Fort Pierce. Fort Lauderdale won the contest on a last-second field goal, by Garrett Ewald of Coral Springs. Fort Myers played its first game June 16.

Results
June 9, 2012Fort Lauderdale 13 @ Daytona Beach 10 in Fort Pierce
June 16, 2012Fort Myers 14 v. Fort Lauderdale 0 in Fort Pierce
June 30, 2012Daytona Beach 16 @ Fort Myers 9
July 7, 2012Daytona Beach 6 @ Fort Lauderdale 0
July 14, 2012 Fort Myers 10 @ Fort Lauderdale 21
July 28, 2012 Daytona Beach 16 @ Fort Lauderdale 14 (SFL Championship Game)

Final standings

2013 season
After numerous proposals and another erroneous draft schedule was released in the 2012-13 offseason, by the time of the April 2013 training camps the league had settled on an expansion to four teams for the 2013 season, adding the Miami Ironmen. The league began play on June 8, 2013 with a baseball-style doubleheader in Fort Lauderdale.

Two days before the start of the season, the league also announced that all six of the SFL's scheduled games for 2013 will take place at Central Broward Regional Park. The Swampdogs were nonetheless renamed the "Pompano Swampdogs" despite no connection to that city; likewise, the league made no effort to relocate the Daytona Beach Racers back to its namesake city, although the team's head coach continued to send news reports to the local newspapers there. The schedule is single round-robin, with each team playing each other once.

Results
June 8, 2013Swampdogs 8 v. Daytona Beach 6
June 8, 2013Miami 18 @ Fort Lauderdale 14
June 15, 2013Swampdogs 14 @ Fort Lauderdale 22
June 15, 2013Daytona 6 v. Miami 42
June 27, 2013Swampdogs 2 v. Miami 10
June 27, 2013Daytona 0 @ Fort Lauderdale 7
July 2, 2013Miami 14 @ Daytona 0 (Semifinal)
July 2, 2013 Swampdogs 12 @ Fort Lauderdale 8 (Semifinal)
July 6, 2013 Swampdogs 6 v. Miami 21 (SFL Championship Game)

Final standings

Resolution
The team formally dismissed all of its coaches in February 2014 and ceased operations; the league released a draft schedule that was to begin the 2014 season in April, but the schedule was removed after none of the games were played and the 2014 season was silently canceled. Commissioner/owner Peter Hulthwaite announced the league's assets were up for sale on August 24, 2016.

References

External links
Official Web site

Defunct American football leagues in the United States
Defunct professional sports leagues in the United States